The diocese of Phan Thiêt is a Roman Catholic diocese of Vietnam. On 25 July 2009, Pope Benedict XVI selected Monsignor Joseph Vũ Duy Thống as bishop, who served until his death in 2017. The creation of the diocese in present form was declared 30 January 1975. The diocese covers an area of 7,854 km², and is a suffragan diocese of the Archdiocese of Ho Chi Minh city.

By 2004, the diocese of Phan Thiêt had about 147,000 believers (13.3% of the population), 80 priests and 64 parishes. Sacred Heart Cathedral (formerly Lạc Đạo Cathedral) in Phan Thiết city (Bình Thuận Province) has been assigned as the Cathedral of the diocese. There are 238 sisters from Lovers of the Holy Cross congregation doing active social and missionary work within the Diocese.

References

Phan Thiet
Christian organizations established in 1975
Roman Catholic dioceses and prelatures established in the 20th century
Phan Thiet, Roman Catholic Diocese of